Botrucnidiata is a genus of cnidarians belonging to the family Botrucnidiferidae.

Species:
 Botrucnidiata damasi Leloup, 1932

References

Botrucnidiferidae
Anthozoa genera